Ha Ha Bay is a natural bay located on the northern tip of the Northern Peninsula of the island of Newfoundland, in the Canadian province of Newfoundland and Labrador.

Ha Ha Bay is a relatively small bay located east of Pistolet Bay. The bay is in a generally north–south orientation with the town of Raleigh, located at the inner part of the bay.

References 

Bays of Newfoundland and Labrador